The provisional government of Israel (translit. HaMemshela HaZmanit) was the temporary cabinet which governed the Jewish community in Mandatory Palestine, and later the newly established State of Israel, until the formation of the first government in March 1949 following the first Knesset elections in January that year.

With the British Mandate of Palestine scheduled to come to an end on 15 May 1948, the governing body of the Jewish community, the Jewish National Council (JNC), on 2 March 1948 began work on organization of a Jewish provisional government. On 12 April 1948 it formed the Minhelet HaAm (lit. People's Administration), all of its members being drawn from Moetzet HaAm (People's Council), the temporary legislative body set up at the same time. The departmental structure of the JNC served as a basis for the interim government ministries.

On 12 May, Minhelet HaAm convened to vote on whether to declare independence. Three of the thirteen members were missing, with Yehuda Leib Maimon and Yitzhak Gruenbaum being stuck in Jerusalem, whilst Yitzhak-Meir Levin was in the United States. The meeting started at 1:45 in the afternoon and ended after midnight. The decision was between accepting the American proposal for a truce, or declaring independence. The latter option was put to a vote, with six of the ten members present supporting it:

For: David Ben-Gurion, Mordechai Bentov, Moshe Sharett (Mapai), Peretz Bernstein (General Zionists), Haim-Moshe Shapira (Hapoel HaMizrachi), Aharon Zisling (Mapam). 
Against: Eliezer Kaplan, David Remez (Mapai), Pinchas Rosen (New Aliyah Party), Bechor-Shalom Sheetrit (Sephardim and Oriental Communities).

On 14 May, the day Israel declared independence, Minhelet HaAm became the Provisional government, whilst Moetzet HaAm became the Provisional State Council. The Provisional government was promptly recognised by the United States as the de facto authority of Israel, followed by Iran (which had voted against the UN partition plan), Guatemala, Iceland, Nicaragua, Romania, and Uruguay. The Soviet Union granted official recognition to Israel on 17 May 1948, followed by Poland, Czechoslovakia, Yugoslavia, Ireland, and South Africa. The United States extended de jure recognition after the first Israeli election, on 31 January 1949.

References

External links
Provisional State Council: Provisional Government Knesset website

 00
Jewish organizations in Mandatory Palestine
Provisional governments
1948 in Israeli politics
1949 in Israeli politics